Between Two Shores is the third studio album by Irish singer-songwriter Glen Hansard. It was released on 19 January 2018 under Anti-.

Chart performance
In Austria it peaked at number 10, number 18 on Belgium's Ultratop Flanders chart, number 185 on Belgium's Ultratop Wallonia chart, number 30 in Netherlands, number 16 in Germany, number 20 in Ireland, number 96 in Italy and number 60 in Scotland. It also peaked on the Billboard charts, debuting on the Top Alternative Albums at number 22, Folk Albums at number 8 and number 42 on the Top Rock Albums.

Critical reception
Between Two Shores was met with "generally favourable" reviews from critics. At Metacritic, which assigns a weighted average rating out of 100 to reviews from mainstream publications, this release received an average score of 68, based on 12 reviews.

Track listing

Personnel

Musicians
 Glen Hansard – primary artist, guitar, producer
 Brad Albetta – bass
 Brian Blade – drums
 Dawn Landes – backing vocals
 Graham Hopkins – drums
 Jeff Haynes – percussion
 Justin Carroll – piano
 Joseph Doyle – bass
 Jon Cowherd – piano
 Markéta Irglová – backing vocals
 Michael Buckley – saxophone
 Rob Bochnik – backing vocals, guitar
 Ronan Dooney – trumpet
 Ruth O'Mahony Brady – backing vocals

Production
 Bob Ludwig – mastering
 Dave Odlum – engineer, producer
 Ed McEntee – engineer
 Patrick Dillett – engineer
 Rob Moose – string arrangements
 Thomas Bartlett – photography

Charts

References

External links

2018 albums
Glen Hansard albums
Anti- (record label) albums